Weather is a 2020 novel by American writer Jenny Offill. The novel is narrated by a college librarian, Lizzie. The book takes place before and after Donald Trump becomes president of the United States and depicts Lizzie's family life and her concerns about climate change. The novel received mostly positive reviews, with favorable comparisons to Offill's previous novel, Dept. of Speculation and praise for its structure.

Composition and writing
Offill worked on Weather for around seven years.  The novel grew out of conversations between Offill and novelist Lydia Millet concerning the potential impacts of climate change. A New York Times article about Paul Kingsnorth further inspired both the novel and Offill's interest in the climate. Before Offill settled on the title Weather, the book had two earlier titles: Learning to Die and, later, American Weather. Offill changed the title from American Weather to Weather in part to avoid participating in a trend she perceived emerging after the election of Donald Trump of books published that included the word in their title.

Offill conducted extensive research about climate change while writing the novel, beginning with climatology, and then moving to psychological and sociological texts that deal with reactions to disasters and the climate. Books Offill read for research include Don't Even Think About It by George Marshall. Offill also read prepper blogs and websites and met with activists. Offill became involved with the activist organization Extinction Rebellion in part due to her research.

Offill admires Joy Williams, and Weather was in part inspired by Williams' assertion that “Real avant-garde writing today would frame and reflect our misuse of the world, our destruction of its beauties and wonders.”. Works including Amitav Ghosh's The Great Derangement and Octavia Butler's Parable of the Sower also influenced the writing and content of the novel. In an interview with Book Marks, Offill has said that Weather is "in conversation" with Don DeLillo novel White Noise as each book includes apocalyptic themes and humor.

Reception

Critical reception
According to literary review aggregator Book Marks, the book received mostly "Rave" and "Positive" reviews.

In a review of the book for the Financial Times, Jonathan Derbyshire compared the novel to Renata Adler's 1976 book Speedboat. The two novels share similar composition, separated into brief, fragmentary anecdotes and moments drawn from the lives of their protagonists. Derbyshire also expressed his belief that a comment by author Donald Barthelme about Speedboat — that it "glimpses into the special oddities and new terrors of contemporary life" — applied to Weather as well. Derbyshire also noted that the novel, despite its focus on climate change and civilizational collapse, has moments of humor, like Offill's previous work, Dept. of Speculation. Dept. of Speculation has also garnered comparison to Adler's book due to its similar composition. The style of writing has also been compared to the works of Lydia Davis. Jake Cline, in his review of Weather for The Philadelphia Inquirer, praised Offill's utilization of short paragraphs and anecdotes, writing: "None of this hopscotching feels random. Offill is in total control here [...]".

Stephanie Bernhard, writing in a review for the Los Angeles Review of Books, referred to the novel as "cli-fi". She grouped it with other novels of the genre set in the present, distinguishing it from the "speculative future apocalypse scenarios that have defined the [...] genre".

Honors and accolades
Weather was shortlisted for the 2020 Women's Prize for Fiction. It was also longlisted for the 2021 Andrew Carnegie Medal for Excellence in Fiction. It was named by the Los Angeles Times, The Guardian, and other publications as one of the best books of 2020.

References

2020 American novels
Novels set in New York City
Climate change novels
Alfred A. Knopf books
English-language books
Fiction set in 2016
Books about the 2016 United States presidential election